Sex Offender is the second album by Polkadot Cadaver released via Rotten Records on May 10, 2011. It charted at 17th place on the Billboard Heatseekers chart on May 28, 2011, and stayed there for one week. The album is also notable as the only Polkadot Cadaver album with bassist David Cullen as a full member and the last album with original DFD drummer John Ensminger.

Track listing

All songs written by Polkadot Cadaver.

Personnel
Todd Smith – Vocals, Guitar, Keyboards
Jasan Stepp – Guitar, Keyboards, Programming, Cello
David Cullen - Bass, Keyboards, Guitar
John Ensminger – Drums

Additional Personnel
Matt Rippetoe – Saxophone
Drew Lamonde – Engineered
Steve Wright – Mixing, Mastering
Patrick Lamond – Cover art
James Wright – Publicity
Jeff Cohen – Legal
Adam Mandell – Legal
T.J. Barber – Additional art
Souleh – Additional art

References

2011 albums
Polkadot Cadaver albums